Miss Czech Republic is a national beauty pageant in the Czech Republic where the winner represents the country at Miss World.

History
The organization was originally called Miss Face Czech Republic until January 2018.

Titleholders 

 Miss World
 Miss Supranational
 Miss Grand International
 Miss International
 Miss Intercontinental

 Top Model of the World
 Miss Global
 Miss Globe
 Miss Tourism Queen International
 Miss Tourism International

Representatives at International pageants

Miss World

Miss Supranational

Miss Grand International

Miss International

Minor pageants representatives

Miss Intercontinental

Miss Global

Top Model of the World

Miss Charm International

Miss Globe

Miss Tourism Queen International

Miss Tourism International

Mister Czech Republic

Mister World

References

Czech Republic
Czech Republic
Beauty pageants in the Czech Republic
Recurring events established in 2010
Czech awards